Thallostoma is a genus of moths belonging to the family Tineidae. It contains only one species, Thallostoma eurygrapha, which is endemic to New Zealand.

Description of species

The wingspan is 18–19 mm. The forewings are elongate and dark purplish-fuscous with whitish-ochreous markings. The hindwings are grey.

References

External links

Image of type specimen of Thallostoma eurygrapha

Tineidae
Monotypic moth genera
Moths of New Zealand
Endemic fauna of New Zealand
Tineidae genera
Taxa named by Edward Meyrick
Endemic moths of New Zealand